John Worthiall,  D.C.L. was  an English Anglican priest in the 16th century.

Worthiall was Principal of New Inn Hall, Oxford from 1514 to 1520. He held livings in Sutton, West Sussex, Iping, Burwash and Iping. Worthiall was Archdeacon of Chichester from 1531 to 1554.

Notes

People from Sussex
16th-century English people
Archdeacons of Chichester
Principals of New Inn Hall, Oxford